The Holy Trinity Cathedral, Port-au-Prince was the main cathedral in the Episcopal Diocese of Haiti. The building was located in downtown Port-au-Prince at the corner of Ave. Mgr. Guilloux & Rue Pavée. Holy Trinity Cathedral has been destroyed six times, including in the devastating earthquake on January 12, 2010.

Murals
The present Holy Trinity Cathedral was known for its interior murals, which depicted various stories from the Bible using only people of black African heritage.  The murals were painted by some of the best-known Haitian painters of the twentieth century, including Philomé Obin, Castera Bazile, Rigaud Benoit, Gabriel Leveque, Adam Leontus, Wilson Bigaud, Jasmin Joseph, and Préfete Dufaut.  They were created under the direction of DeWitt Peters and Selden Rodman of the Centre d'Art, and finished between 1950 and 1951.

2010 earthquake

Holy Trinity Cathedral was heavily damaged in the 2010 Haiti earthquake, and later razed. The cathedral's organ, which was believed to be one of the largest in the Caribbean region, was smashed by collapsing debris in the earthquake. The Holy Trinity complex, which housed trade schools, primary schools and music academies collapsed in the catastrophe.

See also
Episcopal Diocese of Haiti

References

External links
Eglise Episcopale D'Haiti  — official website
Google search for images
Pictures of the murals

Anglican cathedrals in the Caribbean
Buildings and structures in Port-au-Prince
Religious organizations established in 1863
Cathedrals in Haiti
1863 establishments in Haiti